Godamuduna  is a village in the Kandy District, Central Province, Sri Lanka. Godamuduna is situated nearby to the locality Masingamedda and the village Malulla.

See also
List of towns in Central Province, Sri Lanka

External links

Populated places in Kandy District